Nutty News is a 1942 Warner Bros. Looney Tunes cartoon directed by Bob Clampett. The short was released on May 23, 1942. Elmer Fudd's voice can be heard as the unseen narrator.

Cast
Arthur Q. Bryan as Elmer Fudd (voiceover)
Mel Blanc as the Moose Call, Barber, the Man Having Dinner, the Multiplying Rabbits, the Fireflies, Frank Putty, Papa Duck, Baby Chick, Sandy, Hunting Dogs, Lead Dog

See also
 Looney Tunes and Merrie Melodies filmography (1940-49)

References

External links
 
 

1942 animated films
1942 films
Looney Tunes shorts
Warner Bros. Cartoons animated short films
Films directed by Bob Clampett
American black-and-white films
Films scored by Carl Stalling
Cultural depictions of Adolf Hitler
1940s Warner Bros. animated short films
1940s English-language films